Abreu e Lima is a Brazilian municipality in the state of Pernambuco. It is located in the Metropolitan Region of Recife, also known as Greater Recife.

The city was named in honor of José Inácio de Abreu e Lima (1794-1869), also known as "Inácio Pernambucano". Abreu e Lima participated in battles in Pernambuco and fought alongside Simón Bolivar in the wars of independence of Venezuela and Colombia.

Folklore is one of Abreu e Lima's main attractions. Visitors can enjoy the energetic drum rhythms of Maracatu dance performance, as well as Ciranda dance groups such as the one led by Dona Odete do Coco. The city's main festival is the Emancipation Festival, every May 14. Over 70 percent of Abreu e Lima's territory is covered by unspoilt Atlantic Forest and environmental reserves, such as those of São Bento and Caetés.

On March 31, 1983, the city held the first public event of Diretas Já, a popular movement against the military dictatorship.

Geography

 State - Pernambuco
 Region - RMR (Recife)
 Boundaries - Igarassu and Araçoiaba (N); Paulista (S and E), Paudalho (W)
 Area - 
 Elevation - 
 Hydrography - Small coast rivers
 Vegetation - Atlantic forest, Capoeirinha, sugarcane plantation and mangrove
 Clima - Hot tropical and humid
 Annual average temperature - 
 Main roads - BR 101
 Distance to Recife -

Economy

The main economic activities in Abreu e Lima are commerce and general industry, especially chemicals and metallurgic. The primary sector also plays an important role.

Economic Indicators

Economy by Sector
2006

Health Indicators

Religion

Abreu e Lima has the highest percentage (35%) of Evangelical Christians of any municipality in Brazil according to the Brazilian Institute of Geography and Statistics (IBGE) census of 2010, just below the percentage of Roman Catholics. In accordance with Municipal Law 632 of 2008, October 31 is a public holiday in Abreu e Lima, Evangelical Awareness Day (Dia da Consciência Evangélica).

Education

Abreu e Lima is served by 33 schools: 22 in the urban area of the municipality, and 11 in the rural area.

References

Municipalities in Pernambuco